Joia Rara (English: officially Precious Pearl; literally Rare Jewel, figuratively Unique Grace) is a Brazilian telenovela produced and broadcast by TV Globo originally ran from 16 September 2013 to 4 April 2014.

In November 2014, Joia Rara was prized as Best telenovela in the 42nd International Emmy Awards.

Plot 
In 1934, two supposed brothers survived an avalanche in the Himalayas: the millionaire Franz Hauser (Bruno Gagliasso), who is saved by Buddhist monks, and Manfred (Carmo Dalla Vecchia), rescued by a team of climbers. Manfred returns to Brazil with a terrible secret: he sabotaged Franz’s equipment in order to take his place in the family business. After an exhaustive search, Ernest Hauser gives his son up for dead and appoints his bastard son as the director of the Hauser Group.

In the monastery, Franz becomes close friends with the spiritual leader Ananda (Nelson Xavier) and before his return home, the monk promises him that they will meet again in the future. Franz's family is thrilled with his return but Manfred, with his plans thwarted, begins scheming again to eliminate Franz once and for all.

Through a twist of fate, Franz meets the worker Amélia (Bianca Bin), a former girlfriend of one of the climbers who went with Franz and Manfred on the expedition. The two fall in love and, despite family opposition and Manfred's schemes, they stay together and have a daughter, Perola (meaning "Pearl", a very common name in Brazil; played by Mel Maia). Framed in a plot, Amélia is sentenced to jail and so, the child ends up in the custody of her paternal family.

With the death of the monk Ananda, his disciples set out to look for the person who they believe is to be his reincarnation. All signs point to Perola, and upon receiving the news, she is eager to begin her studies at the monastery. It is she who will solve the issues that have been preventing her parents' union.

Production 
For the Himalayan scenes, the Precious Pearl crew spent 20 days in Nepal shooting in the cities of Kathmandu, Patan and Bhaktapur. They also shot in Bungamati, which is a 16th-century village, as well as at the Golden Temple, and at the Shechen Monastery. The production crew used around 60 local extras. Many objects were acquired in Nepal, particularly incense stick holders, bed linens, prayer objects and wooden bowls used by monks, were used for the telenovela set design, at Globo's studios in Rio de Janeiro (Projac).

The 1930s and 1940s were recreated at Globo's production center to allow audiences to dive into the atmosphere of Precious Pearl. Two scenic cities were created, adding up to a total of 8,000 square meters, in addition to approximately 60 studio scenarios. In the Lapa set, a cable car strolls through a 70-meter long rail, built exclusively for the telenovela.

Cast

Ratings 
In Brazil, the telenovela had average ratings of 21 points and 46% share, reaching over 26 million viewers per day. The telenovela's official hashtag, #joiarara, was mentioned 80,000 times, which corresponds to 58% of the total volume of simultaneous online comments. Aired in Portugal, in the Globo basic channel, the plot is daily ranked among the 5 most watched paid TV shows in the country.

Awards and nominations

References

External links 
  
 

2013 telenovelas
Brazilian telenovelas
2013 Brazilian television series debuts
2014 Brazilian television series endings
Brazilian LGBT-related television shows
TV Globo telenovelas
International Emmy Award for Best Telenovela
Portuguese-language telenovelas
Television series about Buddhism